The Journal of Applied Horticulture is a triannual peer-reviewed scientific journal published by the Society for the Advancement of Horticulture (India). It was established as a biannual publication in 1999 and has been published triannually since 2013. The journal covers all aspects of horticulture crops. The editor-in-chief is Shailendra Rajan (ICAR-Central Institute for Subtropical Horticulture).

Abstracting and indexing
The journal is abstracted and indexed in:
CAB Abstracts
Chemical Abstracts Service
EBSCO databases
Emerging Sources Citation Index
Food Science & Technology Abstracts
Scopus

References

External links

Botany journals
Publications established in 1999
Triannual journals
English-language journals
Delayed open access journals